Estació del Nord may refer to:

 Estació del Nord (Barcelona), a former railway station and current bus station in Barcelona, Spain
 Estació del Nord (Valencia), a railway station in Valencia, Spain

See also
 
 North Station (disambiguation)
 Estación del Norte (disambiguation)
 Nordbahnhof (disambiguation)
 Gare du Nord (disambiguation)